Dennis Brooks (born 27 December 1974) is a Caymanian former cyclist. He competed in the individual road race at the 1992 Summer Olympics.

References

External links
 

1974 births
Living people
Caymanian male cyclists
Olympic cyclists of the Cayman Islands
Cyclists at the 1992 Summer Olympics
Place of birth missing (living people)